Leteprinim (Neotrofin, AIT-082) is a hypoxanthine derivative drug with neuroprotective and nootropic effects. It stimulates release of nerve growth factors and enhances survival of neurons in the brain, and is under development as a potential treatment for neurodegenerative disorders such as Alzheimer's disease, Parkinson's disease and stroke.

References

External links 
 Leteprinim potassium - AdisInsight

Anilides
Benzoic acids
Nootropics
Purines